Burst is the fifth extended play from South Korean boy band Up10tion. It was released on November 21, 2016, by TOP Media. The album consists of six tracks, including the title track, "White Night".

Music video 
It depicts those members we’re in the hockey tournament, a member Wooseok was fighting with Kogyeol when they lost their game later then after the game, Wooseok with their girlfriend Jeon So-mi when they hung out together next thing the members Jinhoo, Lee Jin-hyuk and Gyujin we’re in the bridge together, at the night Wooseok went to attempt to win the girlfriend but he was caught cheating against the member Kogyeol, The video ends seeing winning the battle.

Commercial performance
The EP sold 83,737+ copies in South Korea. It peaked at number 1 on the Korean Gaon Chart.

Track listing

References 

2016 EPs
Korean-language EPs
Kakao M EPs
Up10tion EPs